Gridley may refer to:

Places
 Gridley, California
 Gridley, Illinois
 Gridley, Iowa
 Gridley, Kansas
 Gridley Mountain, a peak in Connecticut
 The Gridley River in New Hampshire

Other uses
 Asahel Gridley, Illinois politician
 Reuel Colt Gridley fundraiser for the relief of Union soldiers during the American Civil War
 Charles Vernon Gridley ("You may fire when ready, Gridley.")
 USS Gridley, any of four ships named in honor of Charles Vernon Gridley
Richard Gridley, Chief Engineer to George Washington